The 62nd NHK Cup, or as it is officially known the  was a professional shogi tournament organized by the Japan Shogi Association and sponsored by Japan's public broadcaster NHK. Play began on April 8, 2012, and ended on March 17, 2013. The 50-player single elimination tournament was won by Akira Watanabe. All of the tournament games were shown on NHK-E. The  during the NHK-E broadcasts was female professional Rieko Yauchi.

Participants

Preliminary tournaments
A total of 127 professional shogi players competed in 18 preliminary tournaments to qualify for the main tournament. These tournaments were non-televised one-day tournaments held at the Tokyo Shogi Kaikan and the Kansai Shogi Kaikan. Each tournament consisted of seven or eight players. The initial time control for each player was 20 minutes followed by a 30-second byōyomi.

The female professional seed was determined by a single-game playoff between Hatsumi Ueda and Tomomi Kai, which was won by Kai.

Below are the bracket from two of the preliminary tournaments.

Main tournament
The first time control for main tournament games was ten minutes per player. Once this was used up, a second time control of 10 one-minute periods of  began. Each player was given 30 seconds to make their move. If they did so, then no thinking time periods were used. If, however, they did not, a thinking time period began and they then had up to one minute (more specifically 59 seconds) to make a move before entering the next thinking time period. This process was repeated until a player had used all ten thinking time periods. Then, the final byōyomi time control of 30 seconds per move then began. Sente was determined prior to each game by piece toss.

The 50 players listed below qualified for the main tournament.

Notes:
  "No." represents the bracket position of the player in their respective block and "Rank/Title" represents the rank or title(s) held by the player when the original bracket was finalized. A  grading system is used for ranking players.
 Players whose names are in bold were seeded directly into the main tournament and are as follows:
 61st NHK Cup (four players): Habu (champion), Watanabe (runner-up), Kubo (semifinalist) and Hatakeyama (semifinalist).
 Seven major titleholders (two players): Moriuchi (Meijin) and Gōda (Kiō)
 Class A (six players): Y. Satō, Miura, Tanigawa, Yashiki, Takahashi, and Maruyama
 Class B1 (twelve players): Kimura, Fujii, Fukaura, Matsuo, Namekata, Yamasaki, Suzuki, Nakata, Inoue, Nakamura, Hashimoto and Akutsu
 Other tournament winners (two players): A. Satō (Shinjin-Ō) and Sugai (Daiwa Cup)
 Women's professional (one player): Kai Women's 4 dan (Women's ōi)
 Others with outstanding records (five players): Toyoshima (Class C1), Nakamura (Class C2), Ōishi (Class C2), Nagase (Class C2) and Makino (Class C2) 
Among these 32 seeds, the following 14 were given byes in round 1 and began play in round 2: Habu, Watanabe, Kubo, Hatakeyama, Moriuchi, Gōda, Y. Satō, Miura, Tanigawa, Yashiki, Takahashi, Maruyama, Kimura and Fujii.
 The remaining players qualified by winning preliminary tournaments.

The bracket at the start of the tournament in shown below.

Results
Winners are listed in bold. "Date" refers to the date the game was broadcast. Dan and titles are as of the date the game was broadcast. "Guest Analyst" refers to the kishi who provided commentary during the broadcast. "No. of moves" refers to the total number of moves played in the game.

Round 1
A total of 18 games were played in round 1. Play began on April 8, 2012, and ended on August 12, 2012. The 18 preliminary tournament winners were paired against 18 seeded players.

Round 2
A total of 16 games were played in round 2. Play began on August 12, 2012, and ended on November 25, 2012. The 18 winners from round 1 were joined by the 14 players who had received round 1 byes.

Round 3
Play began on December 2, 2012, and ended on January 27, 2013. Out of the 18 preliminary tournament winners, only Akira Inaba 6d made it as far as round 3.

Quarterfinals
The eight remaining players were paired off against each other with play beginning on February 3 and ending on February 24, 2013. Four major titleholders (Watanabe, Moriuchi, Habu, and Gōda) as well as four former NHK Cup Champions (Habu, Moriuchi, Miura, and Suzuki) made it as far as the quarterfinals.

Semifinals
The two remaining players from each block with paired against each other to determine the respective block winners. The 1st semifinal game between Daisuke Suzuki 8d (sente) and Akira Watanabe Ryūō (gote) was broadcast on March 3, 2013. Watanabe won the game in 122 moves. The guest analyst was Taku Morishita 9d. The 2nd semifinal game was between Masataka Gōda Kiō (sente) and Yoshiharu Habu NHK Cup (gote). The game was broadcast on March 10, 2013, and won by Habu in 116 moves. The guest analyst was Manabu Senzaki 8d.

Finals

After 109 preliminary tournament games and 48 main tournament games involving 160 players, Yoshiharu Habu NHK Cup and Akira Watanabe Ryūō met in the final which was broadcast on March 17, 2013. Habu had won the tournament the previous four years and was on 24 NHK Cup game winning streak; Watanabe, on the other hand, was looking for his first NHK Cup championship and also to avoid losing to Habu in the finals for the second year in a row.  The piece toss before the game resulted in Watanabe being sente and he won the game in 109 moves, thus becoming the 62nd NHK Cup Champion. The guest analyst for the final match were Takeshi Fujii 9 dan and the hosts were NHK announcer  and female professional Rieko Yauchi. A radio broadcast of the final aired on May 3, 2013. The host was NHK announcer  and the guest analysts were Akira Shima 9d, Kazuki Kimura 8d and Takanori Hashimoto 8d.

The game score and a diagram showing the final position is given below.
Sente: Akira Watanabe Ryūō
Gote: Yoshiharu Habu NHK Cup
Opening: Fortress
1.P-76 P-34, 2. P-26 P-44, 3. P-25 B-33, 4. S-38 P-84, 5. S-78 P-85, 6. S-77 S-22, 7. P-56 B-42, 8. B-79 S-33, 9. G-78 G-32, 10. K-69 P-54, 11. P-36 G-52, 12 S-37 G52-43, 13. P-35 B-64, 14. Px34 Sx34, 15. P-46 K-41, 16. P-24 Px24, 17. Rx24 K-31, 18. R-28 P*34, 19. B-68 N-33, 20. K-79 S-62, 21. K-88 P-73, 22. P-66 P-75, 23. Px75 Bx75, 24. P*76 B-64, 25. G-58 S-73, 26. G58-67 S-34, 27. P*36 Px36, 28. Sx36 P*35, 29. S-47 N-73, 30. N-37 P-94, 31. P*24 P*22, 32. P-96 L-93, 33. B-57 R-92, 34. P-16 B-53, 35. P-65 Sx65, 36. B-84 P*72, 37. P-55 Px55, 38. P*52 K-42, 39. S-66 S-74, 40. P-51+ P-86, 41. Px86 Kx51, 42. R-58 P*87, 43. K-79 S-83, 44. B-75 Bx75, 45. Px75 B*27, 46. P*54 B-49+, 47. Rx55 P*52, 48. P-74 +B-48, 49. B*56 R-82, 50. Px73+ Px73, 51. N*65 K-62, 52. N-77 S-84, 53. P-85 +Bx37, 54. Px84 N*64, 55. P-83+, Gote resigns (diagram)

The final tournament bracket is shown below.

Other
 Sente won 26 (a little more than 53%) of the 49 games.
 The average number of moves per main tournament game was 112. The most moves played in a single game was 184 (Rd. 1, Chiba 6d vs. Suzuki 8d) while the fewest moves played was 67 (Rd. 1, Nagase 4d vs. Kamiya 7d).
The age breakdown (age at start of the tournament) for the players who qualified was as follows: 10–19 years old, 3 players; 20–29 years old, 10 players; 30–39 years old, 19 players; 40–49 years old, 16 players; 50–59 years old, 2 players. The oldest player was Michio Takahashi 9d (51 years old) and the youngest player was Kōru Abe 4d (17 years old).

See also
61st NHK Cup (shogi)
63rd NHK Cup (shogi)
64th NHK Cup (shogi)

Notes

References

NHK Cup (shogi)
Japanese television series
NHK original programming